Jomfruland National Park is a national park in Kragerø in Telemark, Norway. About 98% if the park area is sea. The park was established on 16 December 2016.

References

National parks of Norway
Protected areas established in 2016
2016 establishments in Norway
Kragerø